Sir Edward Abbott Parry (2 October 1863 – 1 December 1943) was a British judge and dramatist.

Parry was born in London into a prominent Welsh family, the second son of barrister John Humffreys Parry and grandson of antiquary John Humffreys Parry, a leader of the Welsh literature movement in the early 19th century. His great-uncle Thomas Parry was bishop of Barbados and his great-grandfather Edward Parry was Rector of Llanferres, Denbighshire.

Parry himself studied at the Middle Temple and was called to the Bar in 1885. He was Judge of Manchester County Court 1894-1911 and became Judge of Lambeth County Court in 1911. He wrote several histories, plays and books for children. He was appointed to sit on a Pensions Appeal Tribunal in the summer of 1917, which dealt with appeals against governmental decisions on military pensions, and later published a book on War Pensions: Past and Present, co-authored with Sir Alfred Codrington, another member of the Tribunal.

He died in Sevenoaks, Kent, aged 80.

Parry's autobiography, My Own Way, as published in 1932. To cite one anecdote, he took a summer holiday, probably in 1895 or 1896, in the tiny village of Rhoscolyn on Anglesey and became a great friend of the Revd. John Hopkins, the Rector. When Hopkins died in 1901, Parry was instrumental (with others) in erecting a fine copper memorial tablet in the church. He also published an appreciation in the Cornhill Magazine. There was mutual empathy and warmth of the friendship between two men of very different backgrounds: the London-educated judge, son of a barrister and the iron miner (before his ordination) and son of a Merthyr publican, fined for selling beer during the time of divine service.

Works
1888: (ed.) The Love Letters of Dorothy Osborne to Sir William Temple, 1652-54. London: Griffith, Farran, Okeden & Welsh
1895: Katawampus, its Treatment and Cure. London: David Nutt (many later editions)
Katawampus, its treatment and cure, and the First Book of Krab. Illustrated by Archie Macgregor, coloured by Cynthia Moon. Manchester: Sherratt & Hughes, 1921
1897: The First Book of Krab: Christmas stories for young and old; with illustrations by Archie MacGregor. London: David Nutt
1900: Don Quixote of the Mancha. Re-told by Judge Parry. Illustrated by Walter Crane. London: David Nutt
1914: The Law and The Poor. London: Smith, Elder & Co.
1922: What the Judge Thought. London: T. Fisher Unwin
1923: The Seven Lamps of Advocacy. London: T. Fisher Unwin
1925: The Overbury Mystery. London: T. Fisher Unwin
1929: The Drama of The Law. London: Ernest Benn
1929: The Bloody Assize. London: Ernest Benn
1930: Queen Caroline. London: Ernest Benn
1931: The Persecution of Mary Stewart [Mary, Queen of Scots]. London: Cassell
1932: My Own Way. London, Ernest Benn

References

 The seven lamps of advocacy. Published 1968 by Books for Libraries Press in Freeport, N.Y .

External links

 
 

1863 births
1943 deaths
20th-century English judges
British dramatists and playwrights
British children's writers
Writers from London
British male dramatists and playwrights
Knights Bachelor
19th-century English judges
Lawyers from Manchester